The International Ornithological Committee (IOC) recognizes these 150 species of cuckoos in the family Cuculidae. In addition to the 88 species whose name includes "cuckoo", the family includes anis, roadrunners, coucals, couas, malkohas, and koels. They are distributed among 33 genera, some of which have only one species. Two extinct species (E), the snail-eating coua and the St. Helena cuckoo, are included.

This list is presented according to the IOC taxonomic sequence and can also be sorted alphabetically by common name and binomial.

References

Cuculidae
Cuckoo